Ung County (in Latin: comitatus Unghvariensis; Hungarian: Ung (vár)megye; also in Slovak: Užský komitát/ Užská župa / Užská stolica) was an administrative county (comitatus) of the Kingdom of Hungary. Its territory is now mostly in western Ukraine, a smaller part in eastern Slovakia, and a very small area in Hungary.

Geography

Ung county shared borders with the Austrian crownland Galicia (now in Poland and Ukraine) and the Hungarian counties Bereg, Szabolcs and Zemplén. It was situated between the Carpathian Mountains in the north, the rivers Tisza and Latorca (present-day Latorica) in the south, and the river Laborc (present-day Laborec) in the west. The rivers Latorca and Ung (present-day Uzh) flowed through the county. Its area was 3230 km² around 1910.

Capitals
Initially, the capital of the county was the Uzhhorod Castle (Hungarian: Ungvári vár), later the town of Ungvár (present-day Uzhhorod).

History
Ung is one of the oldest counties of the Kingdom of Hungary. In the aftermath of World War I, most of Ung county became part of newly formed Czechoslovakia, as recognized by the concerned states in the 1920 Treaty of Trianon. The town of Záhony and the village of Győröcske remained in Hungary, which was merged into Szabolcs-Ung County in 1923. 

Following the provisions of the First Vienna Award, all but the westernmost part of the county became part of Hungary again in November 1938, and the county was recreated. In 1939, following the annexation of the remainder of Carpathian Ruthenia after Czechoslovakia became abolished, the rest of the territories became part of Hungary again, however those were assigned to the administrative branch offices of Ung.

After World War II, as the 1920 borders were restored, the westernmost part was returned to Czechoslovakia. The rest (except Záhony and Győröcske) became part of the Soviet Union, Ukrainian SSR, Zakarpattia Oblast, while a small part remained in Hungary.

Demographics

Nowadays, some Romanians living in the area of Poroshkovo also inhabit the area of Ung.

Subdivisions

In the early 20th century, the subdivisions of Ung county were: 

The towns of Veľké Kapušany and Sobrance are now in Slovakia; the other towns mentioned are in Ukraine.

Notes

References

States and territories established in the 11th century
States and territories established in 1938
States and territories disestablished in 1920
States and territories disestablished in 1923
States and territories disestablished in 1945
Counties in the Kingdom of Hungary
Geographic history of Ukraine
Divided regions